Japanese Chinese cuisine or Chūka is a style of Japanese cuisine served by Chinese restaurants popularized in Japan in the late 19th century and more recent times. This style of food is different from modern Chinatown Chinese food in Japan which is considered "authentic Chinese food", e.g. Yokohama Chinatown. The Shippoku style of cooking displays heavy influence from Chinese cuisine. Many of these Chinese dishes were introduced to Japan by Chinese immigrants, others were brought in by returning Japanese soldiers from the Japanese invasion and colonization of China.

Overview 
 is the adjective for Japanese style "Chinese" dishes, or the restaurants in Japan which serve them. Chuka dishes originated in China, but have become modified over the years to suit Japanese taste, often with Japanese or even Western foods. Japanese cooking styles have been added, such as in the case of miso-ramen.  In other cases, only the noodles are "Chinese", as in the case of hiyashi chūka, which was invented in Sendai in 1937, and uses Western food influences such as sliced cured ham. As meat (other than fish) was not common in Japanese cooking until recently, many meat dishes, particularly pork dishes, are of Chinese origin or influence.

Though formerly Chinese cuisine would have been primarily available in Chinatowns such as those in port cities of Kobe, Nagasaki, or Yokohama, and a number of the dishes are considered meibutsu (regional specialties) of these cities, Japanese-style Chinese cuisine is now commonly available all over Japan.  As Japanese restaurants are often specialized to offer only one sort of dish, cuisine is focused primarily on dishes found within three distinct types of restaurants: Ramen restaurants, Dim sum houses, and standard Chinese-style restaurants.

Ramen
Ramen (拉麵）(ラーメン), a dish of noodles in broth, usually with meat and vegetable toppings, is occasionally referred to as Chuka Soba (中華そば, lit. "Chinese noodles.") In Japan, ramen is one of the most popular fast-food options. Though every Japanese city has numerous inexpensive ramen restaurants specializing in these noodles, numerous varieties of instant ramen (much like the Japanese equivalent of the frozen TV dinner) are available. The ramen primarily derives from the noodle soups of noodles in Cantonese cuisine but these noodles have changed much since their origin in China. Four main types of ramen are widely available in Japan: shio ("salt"), shōyu ("soy sauce"), tonkotsu ("pork bone") and miso ("soybean paste"). While the toppings used in ramen are generalized based on the broth type, this can vary from shop to shop. As complements to the noodles, ramen restaurants also commonly offer Japanese-style fried rice and gyoza (pan-fried dumplings).

Dim sum in Japan
Dim sum (点心 tenshin or 飲茶 yamucha in Japanese) in Japan is often very different from that which has been popularized in Chinatowns in the United States and Canada. In Japan's Chinatown areas, restaurants in which numerous dishes are brought around to diner's tables on carts do exist. But, in general, dim sum items have only recently begun to gain popularity around Japan. Instead of carrying full menus of authentic, Chinese-oriented items such as stewed chicken's feet or tripe, Japanese dim sum restaurants, now found in larger cities such as Osaka and Tokyo seem to promote a cafe-like atmosphere. At these cafes, tea and snacks often become the focus, instead of full meals. In general, the menus seem to focus on cafe items, such as Shumai (燒賣 ,minced pork or shrimp dumplings,) sho lon po (小籠包）steamed dumplings with juicy meat inside) and the like. These are usually served alongside of pots of oolong or jasmine tea.

Chinese restaurants in Japan

Chinese restaurants (中華料理屋/chūka ryōriya or 中華飯店/chūka hanten) serve a distinct set of popular dishes that are not necessarily typical of authentic Chinese cuisine. They also cater to Japanese tastes. Currently, most towns in Japan have at least one Chinese eatery, as the cuisine is very popular. There are also many packaged sauces available to easily cook favorite Chinese-Japanese dishes right at home. Some of these typical dishes are:

Dishes derived from Sichuan cuisine:
Mābō-dōfu (麻婆豆腐) are stir fried dishes of ground pork mixture with tofu cubes (mābō-dōfu) in a slightly spicy sauce.
Mābō-nasu (麻婆茄子) are stir fried dishes of ground pork with eggplant (mābō-chezu) in a slightly spicy sauce. The dish was popularized in Japan by Chen Kenmin in 1952.
Ebi no Chili Sauce (えびのチリソース) is a spicy, thick-sauced shrimp dish. As the name suggests, chili sauce is used.
Hoi Kō Rō (回鍋肉) is a stir-fry of thinly sliced pork and cabbage in a miso-based sauce and pinch of chilli . 
Banbanji (棒棒鶏) is a cold dish of steamed chicken which is shredded and covered in a sesame sauce. It is often accompanied by cold vegetables such as carrot and cucumber as a salad or appetizer.
Dishes derived from Fujian cuisine:
Chin-jao Rōsu (青椒肉絲; also called pepper steak) is a stir-fry of thinly sliced beef strips with Japanese green peppers and often bean sprouts in an oyster sauce.
Champon (ちゃんぽん) is a ramen-like dish, topped with fried pork, seafood, and vegetables
Dishes derived from Cantonese cuisine:
Subuta (酢豚) is the Japanese take on sweet and sour pork. It usually has a thicker, amber-colored sauce, unlike the striking orange or red of the Americanized version. Also unlike the American version, it does not typically contain pineapple. Another common dish substitutes the fried pork in this dish with small fried meat-balls, called "niku-dango".  Chicken is sometimes used as a substitute to pork for this dish .
Chāshū (チャーシュー) is derived from char siu (叉燒 barbecued pork tenderloin ). However, while the original Cantonese version is roasted after marinating in a sweet sauce that gives it a red colour, the Japanese version is instead stewed in honey and soy sauce and is in light brown colour .
Shumai (焼売 or シュウマイ) is a type of traditional Chinese dumpling made with pork or glutinous rice . 
Chūkadon (中華丼) is a Cantonese-style stir fry of vegetables and meat on top of rice.
Dishes derived from Northeast Chinese cuisine:
Gyōza (餃子 or ギョーザ), as mentioned before, are a very popular dish in Japan. Most often, they are seen in their pan-fried form, but they can be served boiled as dumplings or even deep fried, as well.  They are also commonly found in Ramen shops as well as general Chuka restaurants.
Kani-tama (かに玉 or 蟹玉) is very similar to the Americanized Egg foo young, but exclusively using crabmeat as the filling. It is served with a thick, brownish sauce, like its American counterpart.

Dishes derived from Jiangsu cuisine:

Chāhan (炒飯 or チャーハン) is sometimes called "yakimeshi", literally meaning fried rice. It is very different from fried rice found in American Chinese or authentic Chinese restaurants, as it uses Japanese short-grain rice, which generally has a stickier consistency than that used in other countries. Additionally, though there are many different recipes using such diverse ingredients as Welsh onion, ground pork, crab, bamboo shoots, the classic Japanese fried rice does not use soy sauce, remaining white when served. It typically uses egg, green peas, and thinly sliced ham.
Shoronpo is the Japanese pronunciation of Xiao Long Bao (小籠包), a steamed juicy pork dumpling (also called a "soup dumpling"), popularized in Shanghai.

Dishes derived from Zhejiang cuisine:

Buta no Kakuni (豚の角煮) is thick slices of pork bellies stewed in a soy sauce based mixture, often served with Shanghai bok choi and Chinese mustard.

Other dishes:
Kara-age (唐揚, lit. Chinese Fry) are bite-sized pieces of chicken thigh, dipped in a thick batter and fried. Usually, it is served without sauce. Some restaurants serve this with a salt and pepper mixture on the side for dipping, and some recipes call for a mixture of soy sauce, vinegar and scallions similar to that used on dumplings.
Yūrinchi (油淋鶏, lit. "oil-drenched chicken") is deep-fried chicken or karaage topped with a vinegar and soy sauce-based sweet-and-sour sauce and chopped scallions, often served on a bed of shredded lettuce.
Harumaki (春巻き, lit. "Spring Rolls") are very similar to those found in Americanized Chinese restaurants, with a thin wrapper and vegetables inside.
Nikuman (肉まん) or Chukaman (中華まん, lit. Chinese-style steamed bun) is the Japanese name for Chinese baozi, steamed buns filled with cooked ground pork, beef, and/or other ingredients.
Tenshindon (天津丼), also known as Tenshinhan (天津飯), is a dish of crab meat omelette (Kani-tama) over rice. The dish name derived from the port city of Tianjin in China.

See also

 Chinese cuisine
 Japanese cuisine
 Korean Chinese cuisine
 Chinese people in Japan

References

External links

 Outdoor Japan - Contains a brief overview of ramen and Chinese-Japanese cooking, as well as other Japanese cooking styles.
 World Ramen.net - Comprehensive Ramen site with pictures and reviews.

Japanese cuisine
Chinese-Japanese culture
Chinese cuisine